The Una Wildlife Refuge is a wildlife refuge in the state of Bahia, Brazil.

Location

The Una Wildlife Refuge is in the municipalities of Una and Ilhéus, Bahia.
The refuge almost completely surrounds the Una Biological Reserve.
Most of the local rural workers and landowners do not distinguish between the wildlife refuge and the biological reserve.
The eastern section of the refuge adjoins the Atlantic Ocean.
The Una River runs through the western section of the refuge.

History

On 15 May 2006 the Brazilian Institute of Environment and Renewable Natural Resources (IBAMA) began public consultations on the proposed creation of the Una and Rio dos Frades wildlife refuges, as well as the proposed expansion of the Pau-Brazil and Descobrimento national parks and of the Una Biological Reserve. 
It became part of the Central Atlantic Forest Ecological Corridor, created in 2002.

Notes

Sources

Wildlife refuges of Brazil
Protected areas of Bahia
2007 establishments in Brazil